Saleh Sokhandan (born on 27 October 1990) is an Iranian designer of optical illusion.

Life 
Sokhandan was a student of electrical engineering at K. N. Toosi University of Technology, who also had experience and background in graphic design. In 2011, He left university and devoted himself to developing a personal artistic style of Anamorphosis that uses optical illusions.

Art 
He has been studying and designing Optical illusion artifacts since 2011. His first exhibition in Optical illusion was performed as a 3-D painting, although it was not his first experience. Sokhandan has created many personal and business artwork, such as park construction, museum structure, graphic designing, and sculpturing based on Optical illusion and layout and drawing 3-D artifacts.

Sokhandan uses improvisation to conduct his first design. Due to the novelty of the field of op arts, the early works of Sokhandan did not attract public attention. Still, over time and the publication of photos of his works on social networks, this art style received more attention than before in Iran, especially in advertising and entertainment.

In 2015, Saleh Sokhandan established an art group named Mr. Op Art, including the experts in this area. They had been experiencing designing Optical illusion since 2011.

Artworks 

In 2014, he designed the logo of TEDxTehran at Vahdat Hall.

In 2018, Roya Park, the first Optical illusion in Iran, was established under the observation of Sokhandan and designed by him and native experts and designers of an artistic engineering team. Some traditional Iranian signs in departments of this structure, like the magic carpet, Arash, Simurgh, and Asiatic cheetah, lead to an exciting feeling of native-born for visitors.

In 2019, Saleh Sokhandan designed and implemented The Reverse House in Chitgar Park. The Reverse House was the first upside-down museum in Iran. However, there were three reverse gravity rooms beforehand in Roya Park.

See also 
 Anaglyph 3D
 Anamorphosis
 Op art
 Trompe-l'œil

References

External links 
 
 
 Saleh Sokhandan's channel on Aparat
 Vidavin
 
 
 
 
 

Abstract artists
Iranian painters
Iranian contemporary artists
Iranian businesspeople
Living people
1990 births
People from Tehran